George Potter Wilson (January 19, 1840 – January 20, 1920) was an American lawyer and politician.

Wilson was born in Lewisburg, Pennsylvania in 1840. He studied at Bucknell University and Ohio Wesleyan University before moving to Minnesota in 1860. He settled in Winona, Minnesota and read law in the offices of Lewis & Simpson and William Mitchell, a former justice of the Minnesota Supreme Court, before being admitted to the bar at Rochester in October 1862.

Wilson served as assistant secretary of the Minnesota Senate from 1854 to 1855 and as secretary from 1856 to 1857. He served as county attorney for Winona 1865 to 1871. In 1871 Wilson was appointed a United States commissioner on the Southern Pacific Railroad. Wilson served as the member of the Minnesota House of Representatives from the 8th District in 1873.

Wilson served three two-year terms as Minnesota Attorney General, serving from January 9, 1874 to January 10, 1880. In 1898 Wilson was elected to the Minnesota Senate from the 41st district. He was reelected in 1902.

A Republican, Wilson was a member of the Methodist Episcopal Church and a Freemason. He was married September 26, 1866, to Ade H. Harrington, a daughter of William H. and Miranda Harrington, who were among the early settlers of Winona. Wilson had three children: Jessie M., later married to William R. Sweatt of Minneapolis, Walter H., and Wilt Wilson.

External links
Profile from the Minnesota Legislative Reference Library
Stevens, Hiram Fairchild Stevens. History of the bench and bar of Minnesota, Volume 1. 1904.

1840 births
1920 deaths
Members of the Minnesota House of Representatives
Minnesota state senators
Minnesota Attorneys General
American lawyers admitted to the practice of law by reading law
Bucknell University alumni
Ohio Wesleyan University alumni